Dot Comedy is an American television series that aired on American Broadcasting Company (ABC). It is notable for being a series that was canceled after only one episode.

Premise
Dot Comedy was an early attempt at bringing Internet humor to mass television audiences in the pre-broadband era, which premiered on ABC on December 8, 2000. The show was hosted by Annabelle Gurwitch, Sklar Brothers, and Katie Puckrik. Adapted from a British show of the same name, the show featured a similar premise to America's Funniest Home Videos in that the hosts and audience react to ostensibly humorous content originating on websites. In addition, Puckrik would interview the creators of the Web content presented. Viewers were also encouraged to submit their own Web content, such as video, audio, and image files.

The show replaced The Trouble With Normal on ABC, which had been cancelled after five episodes as part of a troubled post-TGIF attempt to relaunch the night with adult-targeted sitcoms. Dot Comedy did even worse, being viewed by 4.1 million viewers in its only aired episode before also being cancelled. The remaining four episodes never aired.

Critical reception
Bob Curtright of The Wichita Eagle gave the show a mixed review. He thought that the show had the potential to display humorous content on the Internet and give a platform through which content creators could gain exposure, but criticized the Sklar Brothers' hosting as "superfluous".

References

External links
 

2000 American television series debuts
2000 American television series endings
Television series canceled after one episode
2000s American reality television series
Television series by Carsey-Werner Productions
Works about the Internet
2000s American video clip television series
American Broadcasting Company original programming
English-language television shows